Juvvasshøi or Juvvasshøe is a mountain in Lom Municipality in Innlandet county, Norway. The mountain is surrounded by several other notable mountains including Store Lauvhøi to the northeast, Glittertinden to the east, Galdhøi and Galdhøpiggen to the southwest, and Storhøi to the northwest.

Climate and Permafrost in the Juvvasshøi area
The mean annual air temperature (MAAT) at Juvvasshøi is -4.1 °C. This value is extrapolated from a larger number of official Norwegian weather stations.  According to the experience in other alpine and polar regions this MAAT indicates that permafrost must be widespread and probably extends to a depth of several hundred meters.
Within the EU-sponsored project PACE (Permafrost and Climate in Europe), a 129 meters deep vertical borehole in bedrock was drilled in August 1999 on Juvvasshøi at an altitude of 1893 meters above sea level.  The stable ground temperature at a depth of 100 meters is still -2.6 °C. The measured geothermal gradient in the drillhole of 1.19 °C/100 m allows to calculate a permafrost thickness of 320 meters, a proof that widespread permafrost occurences must exist in the Jotunheimen area at these altitudes.

Juvvasshøi is surrounded by several other notable mountains of Jotunheimen including Glittertinden to the east, Galdhøi and Galdhøpiggen to the southwest. They are even several hundred meters higher. The expected MAAT at these highest peaks is in the order of -7°C, a value characteristic for areas with continuous permafrost and a considerable permafrost thickness. For many Scandinavian scientists, this was surprising and not accepted until the fifth International Conference on Permafrost (ICOP) in 1988 in Trondheim followed by field excursions in Norway and Sweden with international periglacial experts. However, the first permafrost findings date back to the 1970s and early 1980s when thick permafrost occurrences were proved with geophysical soundings.

See also
List of mountains of Norway by height

References

Jotunheimen
Lom, Norway
Mountains of Innlandet